Buccinaria hoheneggeri is an extinct species of sea snail, a marine gastropod mollusk in the family Raphitomidae.

Description

Distribution
Fossils of this marine species were found in Miocene strata in Austria
.

References

hoheneggeri
Gastropods described in 1887